The 1894 SAFA Grand Final refers to the concluding championship matches of the 1894 SAFA season. As Norwood and South Adelaide finished equal on premiership points, a playoff match for the premiership was required.

The Grand Final between Norwood and South Adelaide was drawn. Despite a provision for 20 minute periods of extra time in the event of a draw, the match was abandoned after full time due to darkness; the result stood and a replay was ordered. 

The replay was won by Norwood, with Anthony "Bos" Daly kicking the winning goal as the final bell rang. This was the first replay of a drawn Grand Final in the SANFL.

1894 SAFA Premiership Football Match

1894 SAFA Premiership Football Match Replay

References 

SANFL Grand Finals
SAFL Grand Final, 1894
October 1894 events